The Kochi Municipal Corporation is the municipal corporation that manages the Indian city of Kochi (also known as Cochin) in the state of Kerala. The Corporation manages 94.88 km2 of Kochi city and has a population of 677,381 within that area. It is the most densely populated city corporation in the state. Kochi Municipal Corporation has been formed with functions to improve the infrastructure of town.

History 

The port at Kozhikode held superior economic and political position in medieval Kerala coast, while Kannur, Kollam, and Kochi, were commercially important secondary ports, where the traders from various parts of the world would gather. The Portuguese arrived at Kappad Kozhikode in 1498 during the Age of Discovery, thus opening a direct sea route from Europe to India. With the arrival of Portuguese on Malabar Coast in the late 15th century CE, the power of Zamorin began to decline and Kochi began to emerge as the largest port city on the coast. The Cochin Municipal Corporation was formed on 1 November 1967 merging municipalities of Fort Kochi, Mattancherry and Ernakulam. The municipalities of Fort Kochi and Mattancherry were one among the oldest in the country. 

The region of Fort Cochin had the first municipality in any part of India. The Fort Kochi had its first municipality established under Dutch influence on 18 April 1664 which was limited within Dutch occupied Kochi Stormburg Fort (Immanuel Fort). This was the oldest municipality recorded in Indian sub-continent. However, with handing over Kochi to British as part of Anglo-Dutch treaty, the municipality of Fort Kochi was disbanded and most of the local administration were carried out Pandara officials (Revenue department of Kochi Kingdom). The Ernakulam town was under direct protection of British Resident of Kochi. A municipality under chairmanship of British Resident was commissioned in 1823 to administer Ernakulam town. However it doesn't represent any local population, as it consist of military officials of British East India Company.

In 1866, Fort Cochin municipality reestablished. Fort Kochi, which was a part of Malabar District until 1956, was made a municipality on 1 November 1866, along with Kannur, Thalassery, Kozhikode, and Palakkad, according to the Madras Act 10 of 1865 (Amendment of the Improvements in Towns act 1850) of the British Indian Empire. Its first Municipal Council seating contest was conducted in 1883. This was first modern municipality in the state and also the first native (not under British India) municipality of the country. Much of Kochi's progress in local administration came under reign of Maharaja Rama Varma along with support of Diwan Sankunni Menon. In year 1873, Mattencherry areas were demarcated out of Fort Kochi and a new Municipality board was formed. In 1896, the Maharaja announced establishment of Municipal board for Ernakulam town with 4 members from Palace, 2 members from local communities, one Englishman and 2 members from other religious minorities. The Mayor was nominated by Maharaja. These were the first step towards establishing a modern municipalities in the city.

After independence, these 3 municipalities remained and was brought under Indian laws. In 1956 the erstwhile Elamkulam Panchayat and a portion of Cheranallur Panchayat (Pachalam - Vaduthala) were amalgamated to the Ernakulam Municipality. In 1962 a portion of Palluruthy Panchayat (Mundamveli area) was amalgamated to the then Mattancherry Municipality. Edappally Panchayat was formed in 1946 and Palluruthy and Vyttila in 1953.

The idea behind the formation of Cochin Municipal Corporation was first shaped in the Mattancherry Municipal Council. The Council passed a resolution requesting the Government to form Cochin Municipal Corporation amalgamating the Municipalities of Ernakulam, Mattancherry and Fort Cochin on 9 July 1960. However then the Fort Cochin Municipal Council strongly opposed to the proposal and declared that Fort Cochin was against any such formation. However Kerala State Assembly approved the  proposal of Cochin Municipal Corporation. Govt. of Kerala as per their order G.O. (MS) 276/67/DD dt. 27/9/67 notified the formation of the Cochin Municipal Corporation by amalgamating the three ancient Municipalities of the state, viz. Ernakulam, Mattancherry and Fort Cochin and the Willingdon Island and four Panchayats viz. Palluruthy, Vennala, Vyttila and Edappally and the small islands of Gundu Dweepu, Ramanthuruth having an area of 83.524 km2. The new born Corporation came into existence on 1 November 1967.

Structure 

The corporation is headed by a Mayor. The current Mayor is M Anil Kumar, seconded by KA Ansiya as deputy mayor. Former mayors and deputy mayors include Mercy Williams and C.K. Manisankar. The city is divided into 74 administrative wards, from which the members of the corporation council are elected for a period of five years. The corporation has its central office situated in Ernakulam and has zonal offices at Fort Kochi, Mattancherry, Palluruthy, Edappally, Vaduthala and Vyttila.

For the purpose of administration, the corporation is divided into different departments, each catering to a different aspect of the city's development and welfare. The Personal Department takes care of the general administration of the city. The various departments include that of Town Planning, Health, Engineering, Revenue, Accounts and the Council Section. The corporation has a Janasevanakendram (meaning centre for people's service), that addresses the issues of the public. The corporation  also operates eight maternity and child welfare centers in the city.

Flag and emblem 

The flag of Cochin Municipal Corporation is divided by a left diagonal with white forming the upper part symbolizing the city and blue forming lower part symbolizing the seas. The Emblem was adopted in 1970 which has a huge Ship in center of its crest symbolizing the maritime history of the city.

Naming 
The official name of the body was Cochin Municipal Corporation, as the city was known in its British colonial name Cochin in 1967. The state government renamed the city  to its original Malayalam name, Kochi and the change in name was challenged by the city municipal corporation. However, court has dismissed the plea.

Demography 

The Kochi City has a population of 596,473 as per Indian Census 2001. Kochi witnessed a rapid population growth during the past 30 years. The average decadal growth in Kochi Corporation is 7.83% whereas the nearby municipal areas registered decadal average of 18.65%, and the adjoining panchayaths had an average decadal growth of 12.13%. The Sub-urban areas around the city is showing high rate of population growth and also fast developing trends. The literacy rate is 95.5%

Revenue sources 

The following are the Income sources for the Corporation from the Central and State Government.

Revenue from taxes  
Following is the Tax related revenue for the corporation.

 Property tax.
 Profession tax.
 Entertainment tax.
 Grants from Central and State Government like Goods and Services Tax.
 Advertisement tax.

Revenue from non-tax sources 

Following is the Non Tax related revenue for the corporation.

 Water usage charges.
 Fees from Documentation services.
 Rent received from municipal property.
 Funds from municipal bonds.

Election history

2015 Local body elections 
Soumini Jain from the Indian National Congress served as the mayor of Cochin Corporation in 2015. On the council, Soumini represented the municipal corporation's 36th division (Elamkulam).

2020 Local body elections 
M Anil Kumar from the CPI(M) is the mayor of Cochin Corporation in 2020.

Issues 

One of the main issues that the Kochi Municipal Corporation faces is that much of the modern city has developed outside the official city limits which was last defined in 1967. As a result, the extended urban agglomeration grew much more than any other city of India, leaving the corporation dry in resources. As Kochi is a major industry and thriving modern port-city, it required much more strong leadership and plans, which till now never materialized. The city grew in unplanned way without any masterplan creating more problems. As most of the town-planning agencies like transport, electricity, water distribution were managed by Kerala Government, the Kochi Corporation failed in co-ordinating various agencies implementing various projects. Apart from all these, much of the infrastructural development funds for the city were given to Greater Cochin Development Authority which often creates administrative clashes and issues over implementation.

One of the major issue which the city faced earlier was waste management which aggravated in 2002, which was partially solved by commissioning of the Brahmapuram Waste Management Plant in 2008. However this was gradually converted into a dumping yard. In 2023, a major fire broke out at the Brahmapuram plant resulting in major parts of Kochi city getting engulfed in smoke.

See also
Kochi metropolitan area

References

External links
 Website1
 Website2

Municipal corporations in Kerala
1967 establishments in Kerala
Government of Kochi